"Lookin' Back" is a song written by Bob Seger, originally released as a non-album single in 1971.  As with previous single "2 + 2 = ?", "Lookin' Back" was a criticism of political conservatism.  The single was a moderate success, reaching #96 on the US charts and #2 on the Detroit charts.  A live version of the song was released on Seger's live album, Live Bullet.

1971 singles
Capitol Records singles
Bob Seger songs
Songs written by Bob Seger
Protest songs
1971 songs
Song recordings produced by Punch Andrews